Battle of Guinegate may refer to:

 Battle of Guinegate (1479), part of the War of the Burgundian Succession
 Battle of Guinegate (1513), the Battle of the Spurs, part of the War of the League of Cambrai